Last Seen in Massilia is a historical novel by American author Steven Saylor, first published by St. Martin's Press in 2000. It is the eighth book in his Roma Sub Rosa series of mystery stories set in the final decades of the Roman Republic. The main character is the Roman sleuth Gordianus the Finder.

Plot summary
The year is 49 BC, and there is civil war in the Roman Empire. Caesar is besieging the ancient Greek colony of Massilia in Gaul, which has allied with Pompey. Meanwhile, Gordianus the Finder is desperate to get inside the city to find his son Meto, Caesar's secretary, who has disappeared and is believed to be dead. Once inside, Gordianus must solve the murder of a woman to save his new friend, Hieronymus.

Roma Sub Rosa
2000 American novels
49 BC
St. Martin's Press books
Novels set in Roman Gaul
Novels set in the 1st century BC